The West Indies cricket team toured England in the 1939 season to play a three-match Test series against England. England won the series 1–0 with two matches drawn. A total of 25 first-class matches were played and the West Indian side won eight of them and lost six, with the others drawn. The tour was abandoned a few days after the final test match because of the worsening international situation with the Second World War imminent. The last six matches from 26 August to 12 September were cancelled (see the schedule in the 1940 Wisden).

West Indies did not play Test cricket again until January 1948 when England came to the Caribbean and played four Test matches. England did not play Test cricket after August 1939 until their 1946 season when India toured.

The 1940 Wisden had Learie Constantine of Barbados as Cricketer of the Year along with English players Bill Edrich, Walter Keeton, Brian Sellers and Doug Wright (see Wisden on Cricinfo).

The West Indies team
 Rolph Grant, captain (Trinidad & Tobago)
 Ivan Barrow, wicketkeeper (Jamaica)
 Peter Bayley (Guyana)
 John Cameron (Jamaica & Somerset), vice-captain
 Bertie Clarke (Barbados)
 Learie Constantine (Barbados)
 Gerry Gomez (Trinidad & Tobago)
 George Headley (Jamaica)
 Leslie Hylton (Jamaica)
 Tyrell Johnson (Trinidad & Tobago)
 Manny Martindale (Barbados)
 Derek Sealy (Barbados), wicket-keeper
 Jeff Stollmeyer (Trinidad & Tobago)
 Vic Stollmeyer (Trinidad & Tobago)
 Ken Weekes (Jamaica)
 Foffie Williams (Barbados)

The manager of the team was John Kidney, who played 11 first-class matches for Barbados between 1909 and 1932 and who had managed the 1933 touring team in England.

Of the 16 players in the side, Martindale, Barrow and Headley had toured with the previous West Indies side to visit England in 1933, and Constantine (who toured England in 1923 and 1928) and Grant had been co-opted to that side for a few matches. Constantine had played in West Indies' first-ever Test on the 1928 tour and Sealy (the youngest Test player for the WI) had played Test cricket in the first matches in the West Indies in 1929–30. Grant and Hylton had made their Test debuts in the 1934–35 series in the West Indies.

Eight of the nine other players in the side made their Test debuts during the 1939 tour. They were Cameron, Clarke, Gomez, Johnson, the Stollmeyer brothers, Weekes and Williams. Only Bayley was not capped on this tour, and he never played Test cricket (he probably would have but for the war).

Test series
Three Test matches of three days' duration each were played on the tour.

1st Test

Headley, with 106 in the first innings and 107 in the second, became the first cricketer to make separate hundreds in a Test at Lord's. It was the second time he had achieved this feat against England, having made 114 and 112 at Georgetown in 1929-30. Jeff Stollmeyer, on his Test debut, made 59 out of 147 in West Indies' first innings, and Bill Copson, also making his Test debut, took five for 85. England's reply was based on 196 for Len Hutton. Hutton shared a fourth wicket partnership of 248 with Denis Compton, who made 120. With the whole of the final day to save the match, West Indies looked to be on course at 190 for four, but lost their last six wickets for 35 runs. Copson took four in the innings to finish with match figures of nine for 152. England had 110 minutes to make 99 for victory and did it with 35 minutes to spare.

2nd Test

Rain and bad light ruined the match, with only 35 minutes play possible on the first day. Clarke's leg-spin and Grant's off-spin caused an England collapse to 62 for five, but Joe Hardstaff made 76 out of 111 in 100 minutes. England declared when Hardstaff was out with the thought that the pitch would get more difficult, but Grant made 47 out of 56 with three sixes off Tom Goddard. On the morning of the last day, only Headley, with 51, offered much resistance, Bill Bowes taking six for 33 in 17.4 (eight-ball) overs. England's batsmen failed to take the initiative in the second innings, and the match petered out to a draw. The catch that Wally Hammond took to dismiss Headley in West Indies' second innings was his 100th in Tests: the first player to achieve this apart from wicketkeepers.

3rd Test

Debutant Johnson took the wicket of Walter Keeton with his first delivery in Test cricket, but Norman Oldfield made 80 on his first appearance for England, and with Hutton making 73 and Hardstaff 94, England were all out for 352 before the end of the first day. Jeff Stollmeyer and Headley both made 50s for West Indies in a cautious start on the second day, but then Vic Stollmeyer, making his Test debut, and Weekes added 163 in 100 minutes for the fifth wicket. Stollmeyer was out for 96 but Weekes went on to a hundred in 100 minutes and finished with 137. On the final morning, Constantine hit 79 out of 103 from the final 92 balls of the innings. England lost Keeton and Oldfield cheaply in their second innings, but Hutton (165 not out) and Hammond (138) shared a third wicket partnership of 264, then a world Test record, to make the match and the series safe.

Sources
 Wisden and The West Indian team in England 1939

External sources
 CricketArchive – tour summaries
 West Indies to England 1939 at Test Cricket Tours

Annual reviews
 Wisden Cricketers' Almanack 1940

Further reading
 Bill Frindall, The Wisden Book of Test Cricket 1877–1978, Wisden, 1979
 Michael Manley, A History Of West Indies Cricket, Andre Deutsch, 1988

1939 in English cricket
1939 in West Indian cricket
1939
English cricket seasons in the 20th century
International cricket competitions from 1918–19 to 1945